Robert Antoni may refer to:

Robert Antoni (born 1958), West Indian writer
Robert "Stewkey" Antoni (born 1947), American musician

See also
Robert Anthony (born 1982), wrestler